Lost World may refer to:

Doyle novel and adaptations
 The Lost World (Doyle novel), a 1912 book
 The Lost World (1925 film), a silent film set in South America
 The Lost World (1960 film), set in Venezuela
 The Lost World (1992 film), set in Africa
 The Lost World (1998 film), set in Mongolia
 The Lost World (2001 film), a BBC film
 The Lost World (TV series) (Sir Arthur Conan Doyle's The Lost World), a television series
 "The Lost World", a radio drama in the Radio Tales series

Crichton novel and adaptations

 The Lost World (Crichton novel), a 1995 book
 The Lost World: Jurassic Park, a 1997 film
 The Lost World: Jurassic Park (film score)
 The Lost World: Jurassic Park (arcade game)
 The Lost World: Jurassic Park (console game)
 The Lost World: Jurassic Park (handheld game)
 The Lost World: Jurassic Park (Sega game)
 The Lost World: Jurassic Park (pinball)
 Chaos Island: The Lost World, a video game

Other media and entertainment

Literature
 Lost Worlds (Carter short story collection), a short story collection by Lin Carter
 Lost Worlds (gamebook), by Alfred Leonardi
 Lost world, a speculative fiction subgenre
 Lost World (manga),  by Osamu Tezuka
 Lost Worlds (Smith short story collection), a short story collection by Clark Ashton Smith
 The Lost World, a poetry collection by Randall Jarrell

Games
 Forgotten Worlds (known as Lost Worlds in Japan), a 1988 arcade game
 The Lost World, a 1998 role-playing game for MSX2
 The History Channel: Lost Worlds, a 2008 Macintosh game
 Ricochet Lost Worlds, video game
 Sonic Lost World, a 2013 video game in the Sonic the Hedgehog franchise
 Lost World (pinball), a pinball machine

Music
 The Lost World (album), by Pull Tiger Tail

Film and television
 Lost Worlds (TV series), a History Channel documentary series
 Il mondo perduto (The lost world). a compilation of short documentary films by Vittoria De Seta

Places
 Lost World Caverns, West Virginia
 Lost World, a relict tropical rainforest on Cape Melville with unique fauna

See also
 Lost lands
 Lost city
 Mythical place
 Mythical continents